The Duellist is a 1773 comedy play by the British writer William Kenrick.

The original Covent Garden cast included Henry Woodward as General Gantlet, William 'Gentleman' Smith as Captain Boothby, Edward Shuter as Sir Solomon Bauble, John Quick as Serjant Nonplus, Richard Wroughton as Lord Lovemore, John Cushing as Mactotum and Jane Green as Lady Bauble.

References

Bibliography
 Nicoll, Allardyce. A History of English Drama 1660–1900: Volume III. Cambridge University Press, 2009.
 Hogan, C.B (ed.) The London Stage, 1660–1800: Volume V. Southern Illinois University Press, 1968.

1773 plays
Comedy plays
West End plays
Plays by William Kenrick